Children, Mother, and the General (and also released as Sons, Mothers, and a General) is a 1955 West German war film directed by László Benedek and starring Hilde Krahl, Therese Giehse and Ewald Balser. The film was not a popular success, possibly because its anti-war perspective clashed with support for German rearmament and membership in NATO.

The film's sets were designed by the art director Erich Kettelhut and Johannes Ott. It was shot at the Bavaria Studios in Munich and the Wandsbek Studios in Hamburg. Location filming took place on Lüneburg Heath.

Cast
 Hilde Krahl as Helene Asmussen
 Ewald Balser as General
 Therese Giehse as Elfriede Bergmann
 Ursula Herking as Dr. Behrens, Ärztin
 Alice Treff as Pastorin
 Beate Koepnick as Inge
 Marianne Sinclair as Näherin
 Adi Lödel as Harald Asmussen
 Dieter Straub as Leo Bergmann
 Holger Hildmann as Sohn der Ärztin
 Karl-Michael Kuntz as Edmund, Sohn der Pastorin
 Walter Lehfeld as Werner, Sohn der Näherin
 Peter Burger as Robert, Inges Bruder
 Bernhard Wicki as Hauptmann Dornberg
 Claus Biederstaedt as Verpflegungsgefreiter
 Rudolf Fernau as Stabsarzt
 Hans Christian Blech as Feldwebel mit den Orden
 Klaus Kinski as Leutnant
 Maximilian Schell as Deserteur
 Alfred Schieske as Fahrer mit der Flasche

References

Bibliography
 Hake, Sabine. German National Cinema. Routledge, 2013.

External links

1955 films
1955 war films
1950s German-language films
German war films
West German films
Films directed by László Benedek
Eastern Front of World War II films
Films based on German novels
German black-and-white films
Films produced by Erich Pommer
Films shot at Bavaria Studios
Films shot at Wandsbek Studios
German World War II films
1950s German films